McCaig's Tower, also known as McCaig's Folly, is a prominent tower on Battery Hill overlooking the town of Oban in Argyll, Scotland. It is a Grade B Listed historic monument.

The structure was commissioned, at a cost of £5,000 sterling (£500,000 at 2006 prices using GDP deflator), by the wealthy, philanthropic banker (North of Scotland Bank), John Stuart McCaig.

John Stuart McCaig was his own architect.   The tower was erected between 1897 and his death, aged 78 from cardiac arrest, on 29 June 1902 at John Square House in Oban.

McCaig's intention was to provide a lasting monument to his family, and provide work for the local stonemasons during the winter months. McCaig was an admirer of Roman and Greek architecture, and had planned for an elaborate structure, based on the Colosseum in Rome. His plans allowed for a museum and art gallery with a central tower to be incorporated. Inside the central tower he planned to commission statues of himself, his siblings and their parents. His death brought an end to construction, with only the outer walls completed. Although his will included £1,000 per year for maintenance, the will was disputed by his heirs; their appeal to the court was successful.

Legacy
The structure has been a Grade B Listed historic monument since 1971. The listing summary offers this information:

There was to be a central tower and statues in the arched openings.

The empty shell of the tower dominates the Oban skyline, and is now a public garden with magnificent views to the islands of Kerrera, Lismore and Mull. It is reached via the 144 steps of Jacob's Ladder or by car, but the car park is quite small.

The first wedding ceremony conducted in McCaig's Tower was between Oban High School teachers Jim Maxwell and Margaret Milligan and was reported in the Oban Times published 11 July 2003. Also reported in the Oban Times drinking of alcohol is prohibited in the tower under local by-laws.

References and notes

External links

 Panorama of McCaig's Tower (QuickTime required)

Folly buildings in Scotland
Scottish case law
Oban
Tourist attractions in Argyll and Bute